The New Daily is an online, non-paywalled, Australian newspaper founded in 2013 The founding editor is Bruce Guthrie, currently the editorial director (as at the beginning of June 2019), who was formerly the Editor-in-Chief of the Herald Sun and Editor of The Age.

The paper's former Political Editor, Samantha Maiden, revealed that former Prime Minister Scott Morrison left for a holiday to Hawaii during the middle of bushfires, a story that was later awarded the Walkley Award for Scoop of the Year for 2019.  

Its flagship columnists include Paul Bongiorno, Alan Kohler and Michael Pascoe. It recorded a monthly unique audience greater than The Australian newspaper according to Nielsen digital news rankings for February 2022.

History 
The paper was started by AustralianSuper, Cbus and Industry Super Holdings. In 2016, it became wholly owned by Industry Super Holdings.

The venture has been controversial due to its ownership by non-profit superannuation funds, in regards to both the publication's commercial nature and its editorial independence. The paper says it has an independence charter which lays out a formal separation between news content and ownership.  

In 2017, The New Daily generated A$13,647 profit based on revenue of A$280,125 from advertising in addition to capital investment from its owner. Their total losses for 2017 were A$2.1 million which was covered through a dividend from sister company IFM Investors.

On its fifth anniversary in 2018, the publishers reported significant success in achieving two million unique monthly viewers.

Notable contributors
 Paul Bongiorno 
 Kirstie Clements 
Zoe Daniel 
 Quentin Dempster 
 Francis Leach
 Samantha Maiden
 Michael Pascoe

References

External links
 The New Daily

Australian news websites
Newspapers established in 2013
2013 establishments in Australia
Superannuation in Australia